George James Strong (7 June 1916 – 11 October 1989) was an English professional association footballer who played as a goalkeeper. He played in the Football League for a number of clubs, making over 350 appearances in total.

References

1916 births
1989 deaths
People from Morpeth, Northumberland
Footballers from Northumberland
English footballers
Association football goalkeepers
Hartlepool United F.C. players
Chesterfield F.C. players
Portsmouth F.C. players
Gillingham F.C. players
Walsall F.C. players
Burnley F.C. players
English Football League players
FA Cup Final players